The Season of Men (translit. Maussim al-rijal) is a 2000 French-Tunisian drama film directed by Moufida Tlatli. It was screened in the Un Certain Regard section at the 2000 Cannes Film Festival. The title of the film, The Season of Men, refers to the one month out of the year that the women's husbands come to the Island of Djerba.

Cast
 Rabia Ben Abdallah as Aicha (as Rabiaa Ben Abdallah)
 Sabah Bouzouita as Zeineb
 Ghalia Benali as Meriem (as Ghalla Ben Ali)
 Hend Sabri as Emna
 Ezzedine Gannoun as Said (as Ezzedine Guennoun)
 Mouna Noureddine as Matriarch
 Azza Baaziz as Meriem as a child
 Lilia Falkat as Emna as a child
 Adel Hergal as Aziz
 Houyem Rassaa as Zohra
 Kaouther Bel Haj Ali as Fatma
 Néjib Belkadhi as Sami
 Jamal Madani as Younes
 Sadok Boutouria as Am Ali
 Zakia Ben Ayed as Regaya
 Wajiha Jendoubi as Salwa

Plot
An 18-year-old on the island Djerba, Aïcha, is married to Said, who works in Tunis for much of the year. Before she can join him in Tunis, Said asks that she give him a son. On the island Djerba, Aïcha lives under the rule of her mother-in-law, with a few other wives, while their husbands work elsewhere. Aïcha eventually gives birth to a son and is allowed to move to Tunis with her husband. However, her son Aziz has developmental problems and is likely autistic, which causes Saïd to reject him. Aïcha returns to Djerba, this time with her son Aziz and her two adult daughters. The film uses extended flashbacks between Aïcha and her young daughters living in Djerba prior to the birth of Aziz and then scenes in the present, where Aziz is about eight, just before she moves back to Djerba. The film ends with Aïcha and Aziz working together on the loom, making tapestries that Aïcha sells. The film ends with Aïcha's younger daughter Emna leaving, which Aïcha and Aziz live together in Djerba.

Major characters
 Aïcha: the main character. She is married to Saïd and has a strong will and mind of her own. Though she struggles, she wants the best life for her children. 
 Saïd: Aïcha's husband. He works in Tunis and makes Aïcha live in Djerba until she gives him a son. 
 Meriem: Aïcha's oldest daughter. When she was a child, a man attempted to rape her on her way home from school. She struggles with nightmares and fear of men, though she has chosen to live a traditional life, with a gentle husband—unlike her sister Emna.
 Emna: Aïcha's younger daughter. She is very much a rebel and by the end of the movie, chooses to leave Djerba, after realizing that the older, married man she is sleeping with isn't going to give her the life she wants. 
 Aziz: Aïcha's son, who is likely suffering from some form of autism and has difficulty communicating.

References

External links

2000 films
2000 drama films
2000s Arabic-language films
2000s French-language films
Films directed by Moufida Tlatli
Films produced by Margaret Ménégoz
French drama films
2000 multilingual films
Tunisian multilingual films
French multilingual films
2000s French films